The Pinoy Pop Convention and Concert (PPOPCON) is a music fan convention and concert intended to celebrate Pinoy pop music and culture annually. With its first edition held on April 9 and 10, 2022, it is the first and biggest event of its kind in the Philippines.

The event was announced to take place two years after on-ground concerts had been halted by the COVID-19 pandemic in the Philippines, which caused a two-year lockdown in the country. The April 10 concert was the biggest entertainment event to take place at the Smart Araneta Coliseum since 2020.

Background 
The PPOPCON was first announced on February 15, 2022 across their official social media platforms, announcing that the event aimed to gather P-pop fans and celebrate Pinoy pop culture and music.

The head of PPOPCON Project, Andie Salutin said in a press release:
"P-Pop is quickly gaining international attention and many fans are recognizing the talent and passion of many P-Pop acts.""Through PPOPCON, we are celebrating the growing P-Pop community through the first event of its kind right here at the City of Firsts.”

The COVID-19 pandemic forced established acts like SB19 to do livestreamed concerts and hybrid performances, and debuting acts to do taped performances and music videos to offset the lack of physical connection with an audience. 2022 PPOPCON finally gave the artists and fans to interact and enjoy live music after two years as the event was mostly in-person, while being simultaneously livestreamed online.

On March 30, 2022, a media conference was held at Novotel Manila Araneta City with several Filipino pop groups present in person and through teleconference sharing their preparations and thoughts on the event. On the same conference, SB19 shared their optimism about the positive impact of the first-ever convention for Pinoy pop, saying that it could be the spark that the music industry in the Philippines was waiting for to showcase Filipino talents across the world and adding that P-pop could contribute with the growth of the Philippine economy.

2022 PPOPCON 

The first ever PPOPCON was held on the second weekend of April 2022, with the convention including fan booths, merch sales, games and performances on April 9 at New Frontier Theater and the concert on April 10 at the Smart Araneta Coliseum.

A total of 16 artists participated: 1st.One, 4th Impact, Alamat, BGYO, BINI, Calista, DAYDREAM, DIONE, G22, KAIA, MNL48, PPOP Generation, Press Hit Play, R Rules, SB19, and VXON. 11 of them performed at the concert that took place on the second day.

Promotion 
Leading up to the opening day of the 2022 PPOPCON, various activities were held to promote the event. These included a series of live-ticket selling events, mall shows and artist activities that further ignited the excitement of the PPOP community. 4th Impact, Press Hit Play, KAIA and 1st.One also performed on the famed Wish Bus.

Concert 
The second day, April 10, 2022 featured a concert at the Smart Araneta Coliseum. The following is the concert lineup from the event's official website.

Headlines (in chronological order of performances):
 KAIA
 G22
 VXON
 4th Impact
 Press Hit Play
 BINI
 1st.One
 Alamat
 BGYO
 MNL48
 SB19

2023 PPOPCON 

The second edition of PPOPCON was initially supposed to be held on the third weekend of March 2023 but postponed to later date due to logistic reasons, with the convention including fan booths, merch sales, games, and performances on first day at New Frontier Theater and the concert on the second day at the Smart Araneta Coliseum.

A total of 27 artists participated: recurring artists are all groups from the first edition, with the addition of group artists 6ENSE, Blvck Flowers, HORI7ON, HYV, SMS, VER5US, YARAand YES MY LOVE; duo artists Z2Z; and solo artists Mona Gonzales and former Alamat member Valfer will be making their PPOPCON debut. 11 of them performed at the concert that took place on the second day.

Promotion 
Leading up to the opening day of the 2023 PPOPCON, various activities were held to promote the event. These included a series of live-ticket selling events, mall shows and artist activities that further ignited the excitement of the PPOP community. Press Hit Play, KAIA and 1st.One performed on the noontime variety show Eat Bulaga!, while G22, HYV, and YARA also performed on the famed Wish Bus.

Debut of artists

References

External links 
 

Pinoy pop
Music festivals in the Philippines
Music events in the Philippines